The Rajamangala National Stadium is the national stadium of Thailand. It is part of the Hua Mak Sports Complex, and is located in Hua Mak Subdistrict, Bang Kapi, Bangkok. It officially opened on 6 December 1998.

Overview
It was first used for the 1998 Asian Games in 1998 and 1999 ASEAN University Games in 1999. Since then, it has been used for many international matches and football tournaments. Most notably, for the 2007 AFC Asian Cup. Thai club sides have also used the stadium when playing in continental cup competitions. Krung Thai Bank FC (now BG Pathum United) used it for AFC Champions League matches, and PEA FC and Chonburi FC have recently used it in the AFC Cup. Aside from football, it has been used for athletics, pop concerts, and political rallies.

Rajamangala Stadium was designed by the Faculty of Architecture at Chulalongkorn University. The main material used in construction was concrete and therefore, though the stadium is impressive and imposing, it could never be described as beautiful. However, it is undoubtedly dramatic. The stands rise and fall like a giant, exaggerated version of Huddersfield's Galpharm Stadium. At each end are quite narrow tiers of seats but the tiers rise and rise as they move around the sides until they peak at level with the halfway line. From an aesthetic point of view, the stadium is best viewed from a distance, preferably from the air, where the elliptical shape of the side tribunes seems particularly pronounced.

The aforementioned side tribunes are designated 'East' and 'West'. 'East' is the uncovered popular side; 'West' is the covered side where the more expensive seats are. The two ends are designated 'North' and 'South'. 'North' is the more popular of the two. It's where the more vocal and colorful elements of the Thai support congregate.

The capacity of the stadium is 65,000. When the stadium first opened the capacity was 80,000. But plastic seats were installed on the North, South, and East sides, where previously there had been bare concrete steps, in readiness for the 2007 AFC Asian Cup.

The stadium is not served by public transport which has always been a source of frustration for fans. Presently, there are no train stations anywhere near the stadium (unlike at the National Stadium, which is served by the Skytrain - National Stadium BTS station). However, there are buses and taxis which pass fairly close to the stadium. From 2027, the stadium will be served by the MRT Orange Line.

The stadium hosted the 2012 Race of Champions.

On 24 November 2013, a crowd estimated at 100,000 joined the rally around Bangkok's Democracy Monument in an anti-government protest, according to the Democrat Party, as pro-government red shirts gathered at Rajamangala Sports Stadium.

On 16 September 2019 Sports Authority of Thailand has been closed for renovation to be used as one of the stadiums for 2020 AFC U-23 Championship, which Thailand hosted in January 2020 to select 3 teams to compete in the 2020 Summer Olympics in Tokyo, Japan.

On 12 July 2022, Rajamangala Stadium held the world-class football match for teams in the Premier League named "The MATCH Final Bangkok Century Cup 2022" between Manchester United vs. Liverpool, with improvements of the field and stadium to support the competition.

Other stadiums in Bangkok include the Thai Army Sports Stadium, the Thai-Japanese Stadium, and Chulalongkorn University Stadium.

Performances

Past performances
Carabao 15 Year Celebrate-Made in Thailand Concert - 25 December 1999
B - Day Concert - 10 December 2004
Bangkok Music Festival - 7 May 2005
Asanee-Wasan Rumrai Concert - 17 November 2007
YAMAHA Presents SMTOWN Live’08 in Bangkok - 7 February 2009
Show King M Bangkok - 6 April 2010
Soda Chang Presents Bodyslam Live In Kraam By Air Asia - 27 November 2010
Korean Music Wave in Bangkok presented by JL Starnet - 12 March 2011
Bangkok Summer Festival By Coca-Cola - 7–8 May 2011
MBC Korean Music Wave in Bangkok 2012 - 7 April 2012
Lady Gaga Born This Way Ball Tour - 25 May 2012
M! Countdown Smile-Thailand - 11 October 2012
Race of Champions - 14–16 December 2012
The Voice Thailand "True Sound Real Sound" - 2 March 2013
One Direction On the Road Again Tour - 14 March 2015
 Coldplay A Head Full of Dreams Tour - 7 April 2017 
 BTS Love Yourself World Tour - 6–7 April 2019 
Ed Sheeran ÷ Tour - 28 April 2019
 Justin Bieber Justice World Tour - November 6, 2022 (Postponed)
 Maroon 5 World Tour 2022 - December 10, 2022
 37th Golden Disc Awards - January 7, 2023

Upcoming performances

 Harry Styles Love On Tour - March 11, 2023
 BLACKPINK Born Pink World Tour - May 27, 2023 and May 28, 2023

Tournament results
The stadium has hosted several international FIFA matches. Here is a list of the most important international matches held at the Rajamangala Stadium.

1998 Asian Games

2000 AFF Championship

2007 AFC Asian Cup

2008 AFF Championship

2012 AFF Championship

2014 AFF Championship

2016 AFF Championship

2018 AFF Championship

2020 AFC U-23 Championship

Gallery

See also
 National Stadium

References

External links

Stadium picture
World Stadiums.com

National stadiums
Sports venues in Thailand
Football venues in Thailand
Athletics (track and field) venues in Thailand
Sports venues in Bangkok
AFC Asian Cup stadiums
Stadiums of the Asian Games
Bang Kapi district
Sports venues completed in 1998
1998 establishments in Thailand